Sistani Persians (Persian: مردم سیستانی) (also known as the Sistanis, Sistan, and historically referred to Sagzi) are a Persian ethnic group, who primarily inhabit Sistan in southeastern Iran and historically southwestern Afghanistan as well.  Their descendants in Afghanistan are primarily the Pashtun tribe of the Sakzai who are the largest ethnicity in the Southwestern parts of Afghanistan.  

They live in the northern part of Sistan and Balouchistan province, where they form a major minority (40–50% of the province) after the Baloch people. Since recent decades many also have migrated to other parts of Iran such as Tehran and Golestan provinces in northern Iran. The largest city of Sistan region is Zabol. Sistanis speak a dialect of Persian known as Sistani or Zaboli.

Sistani Persians are Shia Muslim, in contrast to Baloch people who are Sunni Muslim. The Iranian Shia cleric Ayatollah Sistani, though from Mashhad, had an ancestor who moved to Sistan during the Safavid era to engage in religious activities in the region.

Etymology
Sistanis derive their name from Sakastan ("the land of the Saka"). The Sakas were a Scythian tribe migrated to the Iranian Plateau. The more ancient Old Persian name of the region – prior to Saka dominance – was Zaranka or Drangiana ("waterland"). This older form is also the root of the name Zaranj, capital of the Afghan Nimruz Province. The Drangians were listed among the peoples ruled by the legendary King Ninus before the Achaemenids. Its people were Zoroastrian. Sistan had a very strong connection with Zoroastrianism and during Sassanid times Lake Hamun was one of two pilgrimage sites for followers of that religion. In Zoroastrian tradition, the lake is the keeper of Zoroaster's seed and just before the final renovation of the world, three maidens will enter the lake, each then giving birth to the saoshyans who will be the saviours of mankind at the final renovation of the world.

In the Shahnameh, Sistan is also referred to as Zabulistan, after the region in the eastern part of present-day Afghanistan. In Ferdowsi's epic, Zabulistan is in turn described to be the homeland of the mythological hero Rostam.

History

Early History

The Drangians were listed among the peoples ruled by the legendary King Ninus before the Achaemenids.

Sassanian Era
The province was formed in ca. 240, during the reign of Shapur I, in his effort to centralise the empire; before that, the province was under the rule of the Parthian Suren Kingdom, whose ruler Ardashir Sakanshah became a Sasanian vassal
Its people were Zoroastrian. Sistan had a very strong connection with Zoroastrianism and during Sassanid times Lake Hamun was one of two pilgrimage sites for followers of that religion. In Zoroastrian tradition, the lake is the keeper of Zoroaster's seed and just before the final renovation of the world, three maidens will enter the lake, each then giving birth to the saoshyans who will be the saviours of mankind at the final renovation of the world.

Islamic conquest
During the Muslim conquest of Persia, the last Sasanian king Yazdegerd III fled to Sakastan in the mid-640s, where its governor Aparviz (who was more or less independent), helped him. However, Yazdegerd III quickly ended this support when he demanded tax money that he had failed to pay.

In 650, Abd-Allah ibn Amir, after having secured his position in Kerman, sent an army under Mujashi ibn Mas'ud to Sakastan. After having crossed the Dasht-i Lut desert, Mujashi ibn Mas'ud arrived to Sakastan. However, he suffered a heavy defeat and was forced to retreat.

One year later, Abd-Allah ibn Amir sent an army under Rabi ibn Ziyad Harithi to Sakastan. After some time, he reached Zaliq, a border town between Kirman and Sakastan, where he forced the dehqan of the town to acknowledge Rashidun authority.  He then did the same at the fortress of Karkuya, which had a famous fire temple, which is mentioned in the Tarikh-i Sistan. He then continued to seize more land in the province. He thereafter besieged Zrang, and after a heavy battle outside the city, Aparviz and his men surrendered. When Aparviz went to Rabi to discuss about the conditions of a treaty, he saw that he was using the bodies of two dead soldiers as a chair. This horrified Aparviz, who in order to spare the inhabitants of Sakastan from the Arabs, made peace with them in return for heavy tribute, which included a tribute of 1,000 slave boys bearing 1,000 golden vessels. Sakastan was thus under the control of the Rashidun Caliphate.

Post-Arab Islamic era

The Saffarid dynasty, which was the first fully independent Iranian empire after the Arab rule, was founded by Ya’qub Bin Laith Saffari. Ya'qub worked as a coppersmith (ṣaffār) before becoming a warlord. He conquered most of present-day Iran and after seizing control of the Sistan region also began conquering most of Pakistan, and Afghanistan, and later on, Tajikistan, Turkmenistan and Uzbekistan.

See also
 Bibi Seshanbe
 Baas-o-Beyt

References

Sources

 

 

Sistan
Ethnic groups in Iran